The 2nd Executive Council of the People's Republic of Croatia was that state's executive branch of government from 1953 to 1958. The Executive Council was voted in at a joint session of the Republican Council and the Council of Producers on 18 December 1953.

Members

References

Bibliography

Socialist Republic of Croatia
League of Communists of Croatia
Cabinets established in 1953
Cabinets disestablished in 1958